Death Is Not a Joyride is an Austin, Texas-based experimental art rock three piece. Because of a diverse arrangement of instruments and tendency to explore different genres, the band has been described as having elements of post-rock, punk, goth, indie, trip hop and electronica. In addition to doing their first two tours in 2008, the band recently played at an official SXSW showcase and has played with several notable bands including Gang Gang Dance, The Dresden Dolls, Faun Fables, Titus Andronicus, Xiu Xiu, The Paper Chase, Carla Bozulich, Gram Rabbit and Mothfight.

In December 2009, the band announced that vocalist Kacy Ritter had left the band, and they would continue as an instrumental four piece. Later that month, they released two new songs on their website.

Discography
 The Human Zoo (2008) Self released, recorded and mixed by John Congleton

Compilations 
 "Chiffon Tutu, Dancing Bear" featured on LUCY Magazine Issue 1 Compilation CD (2009) Lucy the Poodle Productions
 "Masochism in the Trade" featured on ATX Underground Volume 1 (2008) ATX Underground

See also
 Music of Austin

References

 Sources consulted 

 
 
 

 Endnotes

External links
  – Official website
 Myspace
 last.fm
 Twitter

2006 establishments in Texas
American experimental musical groups
Indie rock musical groups from Texas
Musical groups established in 2006
Musical groups from Austin, Texas
New Weird America
Psychedelic rock music groups from Texas